Unión de San Antonio is a town and municipality located in the Mexican state of Jalisco. It is named after Saint Anthony of Padua since the first church built there was in his honor. As of 2005, the municipality had a population of 15,484. The main local industry is agriculture, including maize, wheat, beans, and livestock.

The small town receives its name from the intersection of two roads at the "Old Dam", which currently still exists on the east side of town. Through the hard work of Don Pablo and Don Jose Antonio, they constructed the chapel that became the heart and center of the town and the magnificent church it is today.

Famous residents 
 José Antonio Sánchez Reza A priest who sympathized with Miguel Hildago's cause and helped to support him. 
 José Elías Moreno, an actor from the Classic era of the motion pictures was born here.
  María Teresa Rivas, an actress from the Classic era of the motion pictures was born here.
 Amador Granados, narco pelicula actor, was born here.

History 

At the beginning of the nineteenth century it was known as Hacienda of Saint Anthony of the Adobes and later Villa of Union.

References 

Municipalities of Jalisco